Penicillium laeve is a species of the genus of Penicillium.

References

laeve
Fungi described in 2011